Vlasta Matulová (31 October 1918 – 18 April 1989) was a Czech actress. She appeared in more than twenty films from 1940 to 1977.

Selected filmography

References

External links 

1918 births
1989 deaths
Actors from Brno
People from the Margraviate of Moravia
Czechoslovak film actresses
20th-century Czech actresses